These are the official results of the Women's 10 km walk event at the 1994 European Championships in Helsinki, Finland, held on 9 August 1994.

Medalists

Abbreviations
All times shown are in hours:minutes:seconds

Records

Results

Participation
According to an unofficial count, 33 athletes from 18 countries participated in the event.

 (2)
 (1)
 (3)
 (1)
 (3)
 (1)
 (1)
 (3)
 (1)
 (1)
 (2)
 (1)
 (2)
 (1)
 (3)
 (2)
 (2)
 (3)

See also
 1987 Women's World Championships 10 km walk (Rome)
 1991 Women's World Championships 10 km walk (Tokyo)
 1992 Women's Olympic 10 km walk (Barcelona)
 1993 Women's World Championships 10 km walk (Stuttgart)
 1995 Women's World Championships 10 km walk (Gothenburg)
 1996 Women's Olympic 10 km walk (Atlanta)
 1997 Women's World Championships 10 km walk (Athens)

References

 Results
 todor66

Walk 10 km
Racewalking at the European Athletics Championships
1994 in women's athletics